Maropati is a comune (municipality) in the Province of Reggio Calabria in the Italian region Calabria, located about  southwest of Catanzaro and about  northeast of Reggio Calabria.

The municipality of Maropati contains the frazione (subdivision) Tritanti.

Maropati borders the following municipalities: Anoia, Feroleto della Chiesa, Galatro, Giffone.

Demographic evolution

References

External links
 www.ilmiosud.it.it/

Cities and towns in Calabria